Los Shakers were a popular rock band in the 1960s and was a part of the Uruguayan Invasion in Latin America.  They were heavily influenced by the look and sound of The Beatles. In the late 1960s they would broaden and expand their musical direction before breaking up in 1969.

History 
The band was formed in 1964 in Montevideo, Uruguay by brothers Hugo (lead guitar and keyboards) and Osvaldo Fattoruso (rhythm guitar), after watching the movie A Hard Day's Night starring The Beatles. They were modeled after The Beatles and even adopted similar haircuts and clothing. The band sang many songs in English, despite their location, and gained their greatest popularity in Argentina, but also had popularity in other Latin American countries.

They signed with the Odeon label of EMI in Argentina. The first single recorded as The Shakers was "Break it All" in late 1964, which reached number 9 on Argentine charts. A self-titled album was released later in 1965. Though the band focused their attentions almost exclusively on Latin America, they did take one crack at the English-speaking market when they released the album Break It All, on the US-based Audio Fidelity Records in 1966. The record (which featured re-recorded versions of many of the songs on their original LP and even a Spanish-language version of The Beatles' "Ticket to Ride") was little more than a curiosity in the United States and was not a hit, but became a collector's item decades later, as would their second album, Shakers for You (released in 1966). Both albums were re-issued, with bonus tracks, on CD in 2007.

Reflecting the move towards psychedelia, their music went in a new direction. Their last studio album with the original line up, La conferencia secreta del Toto's Bar, released in 1968, mixed psychedelic influences with candombe and some tango sounds; the album has been described as a Latin American Sgt. Pepper's Lonely Hearts Club Band. However, their recording label (EMI) did not approve of this new sound, and left them without any promotion or support; it led to the band's split up. In 2005, the original lineup re-united, and recorded a CD Bonus Tracks and played in Argentina and Uruguay. Los Shakers would break up shortly thereafter.

Osvaldo Fattoruso, guitarist and drummer, died on July 29, 2012, due to cancer at the age of 64.

Members
Hugo Fattoruso - lead vocals, guitar, piano, harmonica
Osvaldo Fattoruso - guitar, vocals
Roberto "Pelín" Capobianco - bass guitar, bandoneon, backing vocals
Carlos "Caio" Vila - drums, backing vocals

Discography

Albums

Singles

Compilations

See also
 Los Mockers

References

External links
Official site
Los Shakers biography and discography at AllMusic.com
Los Shakers discography at Discogs.com
Review of La Conferencia Secreta Del Toto's Bar 
Video of Los Shakers "Break it All"
Miscellaneous color/B&W Videos of Los Shakers at Youtube
Los Shakers 
Info on Los Shakers

Uruguayan rock music groups
Beat groups
Musical groups established in 1963
1963 establishments in Uruguay